Mothership Player's Survival Guide is a science fiction horror role-playing game published by Tuesday Knight Games in 2018.

Description
Mothership is an independently produced role-playing game with Old School Revival style rules that marries science fiction and horror.

Character creation
Players first choose which of four classes their character belongs to: Crew member, Scientist, Android, or Marine.  Each class has minor bonuses to attributes, a set of skills, and a special ability. The player then rolls six 10-sided dice for each of the character's four attributes: Strength, Speed, Intellect, and Combat.  The player likewise rolls the same dice to determine the four Resistances: Mind, Mental, Structure, and Endurance.  

The players must also create a spaceship, using complex creation rules.

Gameplay
To determine success or failure of actions, the player must roll a number on percentile dice that is less than the relevant attribute or Resistance. For example, if the character has a strength of 33, and attempts an action that requires strength, the player must roll 33 or less on percentile dice for the action to succeed. 

Characters who survive their first session automatically reach second level, and then reach third level after two more sessions. Thereafter, progression slows to the point where a character must survive several dozen sessions to gain a level.

Publication history   
Mothership was designed by Sean McCoy, who was inspired by some of the original science fiction role-playing games such as Metamorphosis Alpha. McCoy also provided all the illustrations. The 44-page softcover saddle-stapled book was published by Tuesday Knight Games in 2018. Two years later, a Polish-language edition, Mothership: Przewodnik Przetrwania Gracza, was released in Poland by Tajemnicze RPG.

Reception
Patrick Kanouse reviewed Mothership Player's Survival Guide for Black Gate, and stated that "Mothership is an easy recommendation. The mechanics are simple but contribute to the feel of the game and also being hackable. Adding additional mechanics for things like cyberware, more weapons, and so on are easy enough (and some exist from those third-parties). Pick up this game. See if you can survive the horrors with your life or sanity. Either way, it'll be wicked fun."

Writing for the Polish site Poltergeist, Adam Waskiewicz was less than impressed with the artwork, calling most of the illustrations "sloppy sketches." However, he found the rules to be well written, noting "we get simple and quick mechanics, adapted to play sessions in which characters will easily lose their lives and healthy senses, and survival (not to mention a promotion) will only be for a lucky few." However, Waskiewicz was disappointed by the lack of information about "what the sessions or campaigns in this system should look like." He also found "Another problem that is troubling is the lack of even a rudimentary bestiary." Although he thought that "Mothership does not offer much, and it will be difficult for it to compete with other systems in this genre,"  he concluded, "it is definitely worth getting acquainted with, especially if someone likes the cosmic horror genre or the [Old School Rules] atmosphere."

Awards
Mothership Player's Survival Guide won the 2019 Gold ENnie Award for Best Game.

References

External links
Mothership Player's Survival Guide at RPGGeek

ENnies winners
Science fiction role-playing games